The 1903 Ole Miss Rebels football team represented the University of Mississippi during the 1903 Southern Intercollegiate Athletic Association football season. The season's only loss was to Vanderbilt.

Schedule

References

Ole Miss
Ole Miss Rebels football seasons
Ole Miss Rebels football